Kenneth William Greer (born 25 July 1954) is a Canadian guitarist and keyboardist. He is one of the founding members of the Canadian rock band Red Rider.

Biography

Greer is the youngest of seven children born into a musical family in Toronto, Ontario. He grew up in the North Toronto area. He played the pedal steel guitar.

After a Red Rider hiatus during most of the 1990s, Greer was involved in numerous musical projects including Big Faith, Hunter-Greer and Gowan. Currently he stills tours as Tom Cochrane and Red Rider, playing guitar, pedal steel and keyboards. He also started touring with the Canadian country band The Road Hammers in 2005 and still joins them when available.

Career achievements
Juno Awards

-Won for "Group of the Year" in 1987

-Nominated for 11 various awards from 1981 to 1990

Gold & Platinum Records
-Nearly every Red Rider record went Gold or Platinum in Canada, with the band's most commercially successful effort  "Victory Day" achieving Double Platinum.

Canadian Country Music Awards

-Won for All-Star Band Member, Steel Guitar in 2005 & 2007

Discography
 1980 – Red Rider – Don't Fight It
 1981 – Red Rider – As Far as Siam
 1983 – Red Rider – Neruda
 1984 – Red Rider – Breaking Curfew
 1986 – Tom Cochrane & Red Rider – S/T
 1988 – Tom Cochrane & Red Rider – Victory Day
 1989 – Tom Cochrane & Red Rider – The Symphony Sessions (live CD)
 1992 – Big Faith – Grounded
 1993 – Tom Cochrane - Ashes to Diamonds A Collection
 1994 – Big Faith – Undertow
 1994 – Hunter-Greer – Tales From Stoney's Bar & Grill
 2002 – Tom Cochrane & Red Rider – Trapeze
 2006 – Tom Cochrane – No Stranger
 2015 – Tom Cochrane - Take It Home

Producer
 1987 – The Tragically Hip – The Tragically Hip EP
 1989 – The Saddletramps – The Saddle Tramps
 1994 – Peter Randall & The Raindogs – Peter Randall & The Raindogs
 2002 – Andrew Brunet – Broken
 2002 – Various Artists – Takin' Care of Christmas
 2004 – Tango Sierra – This Is It

Official website
 Official Ken Greer website

Appearances on other albums as musician
 1990 – Lost Brotherhood – Gowan
 1993 – ...But You Can Call Me Larry – Lawrence Gowan
 1994 – Borrowed Tunes: A Tribute to Neil Young – "Heart of Gold" Lawrence Gowan

References

1954 births
Living people
Canadian rock keyboardists
Canadian rock guitarists
Canadian male guitarists
Musicians from Toronto
Pedal steel guitarists
Red Rider members
20th-century Canadian guitarists
21st-century Canadian guitarists
Canadian record producers
20th-century Canadian male musicians
21st-century Canadian male musicians